The Ellicott Creek Bike Path follows Ellicott Creek in the Town of Amherst in New York State near the University at Buffalo, and flows under Interstate 990 before leaving Amherst by crossing U.S. Route 62 (Niagara Falls Boulevard) to enter the Town of Tonawanda at Ellicott Creek Park.  The Bike Path runs along Ellicott Creek, a stream in Western New York, United States that is a tributary of Tonawanda Creek, which in turn flows into the Niagara River.

Site of murder of Linda Yalem

In 1990, the Ellicott Creek Bike Path was the last known location where University at Buffalo (UB) Sophomore Linda Yalem was alive.  Yalem studied communications at UB and was training for the New York City Marathon when she was raped and killed by Altemio Sanchez on September 29, 1990 while on a run on the Ellicott Creek Bike Path near UB.  Her body was found near the Bike Path.

References

Tourist attractions in Erie County, New York
Bike paths in New York (state)
Murder in New York (state)
Crimes in New York (state)